Qiziriq is a district of Surxondaryo Region in Uzbekistan. The capital lies at the town Sariq. In 2019 it lost part of its territory to the re-established Bandixon District.

The district consists of 5 urban-type settlements (Sariq, Kunchiqish, Yangi hayot, Karmaki, Istara) and 10 rural communities (Zarkamar, Olmazor, Bandixon, Qiziriq, Kirshak, Chorvador, Paxtakor, Sharq Istara, Yangi yoʻl, Mehnatobod).

References

Districts of Uzbekistan
Surxondaryo Region